Marvin "Harris" DeVane Jr. (August 2, 1963 – March 1, 2018) was an American stock car racing driver. He competed in the ARCA Racing Series, scoring his only career series victory in one of the closest finishes in series history at Atlanta Motor Speedway.

Personal life
A peanut farmer and a native of Cuthbert, Georgia, DeVane attended Randolph Southern School and is a graduate of Abraham Baldwin Agricultural College.

Racing career
DeVane began racing in 1978 at Albany Motor Speedway. Moving to touring series competition in the early 1990s, he made 59 starts in the ARCA Racing Series between 1994 and 1998. In 1995 he won the series' Bill France Four Crown Award, given to the driver with the best finishes on each of the types of tracks (superspeedway, road course, short track, and dirt track) the series competes on, and was the series' co-Rookie of the Year; after fellow rookie Andy Hillenburg became ineligible for the rookie title due to winning the series championship, he was tied with Dill Whittymore, and the series chose to equally award the title to both drivers. He also won the series' Most Popular Driver award that season.

DeVane scored one win in the ARCA Racing Series, at Atlanta Motor Speedway in 1997. It was the first race run on the track's current configuration; he led only the last  of the final lap of the race, moving from third to first to beat Andy Hillenburg and Frank Kimmel by 0.023 seconds.

DeVane also competed on a limited basis in NASCAR competition; in 1994, he attempted to qualify for a Busch Series Grand National Division event at Talladega Superspeedway, but failed to make the field. He also attempted to qualify for two Winston Cup Series races, both at Atlanta Motor Speedway: his first attempt at making his debut in the series was at the NAPA 500 in the fall of 1998, with his second attempt at the Cracker Barrel 500 in the spring of 1999; however, he failed to qualify for either event. He was hospitalized after crashing during his second-round qualifying attempt for the NAPA 500, and withdrew before second-round qualifying in 1999 due to a lack of speed.

Death
DeVane died on March 1, 2018, after a brief illness at age 54.

Motorsports career results

NASCAR
(key) (Bold – Pole position awarded by qualifying time. Italics – Pole position earned by points standings or practice time. * – Most laps led.)

Winston Cup Series

Busch Series

ARCA Bondo/Mar-Hyde Series
(key) (Bold – Pole position awarded by qualifying time. Italics – Pole position earned by points standings or practice time. * – Most laps led.)

References

External links

1963 births
2018 deaths
People from Cuthbert, Georgia
Farmers from Georgia (U.S. state)
Racing drivers from Georgia (U.S. state)
NASCAR drivers
ARCA Menards Series drivers